Juan Sebastián Cabal and Carlos Salamanca were the defending champions but Cabal decided not to participate.
Salamanca partnered with Christopher Diaz-Figueroa.

Seeds

Draw

Draw

References
 Main Draw

Quito Challenger - Doubles
2013 Doubles